Chisago may refer to:

 Chisago City, Minnesota, Minnesota
 Chisago County, Minnesota
 Chisago Lakes, Chisago County, Minnesota